Christmas at Cattle Hill is a 2020 Norwegian 3D computer-animated Christmas film directed by Will Ashurst from a screenplay by Ole Christian Solbakken. A sequel to Cattle Hill (2018), it was produced by Qvisten Animation. Heidi Palm Sandberg and Ove Heiborg acted as producers. Christmas at Cattle Hill was released theatrically in Norway on 6 November 2020, grossing $1,088,688.

Premise 
Klara is excited to spend her first Christmas on Cattle Hill with her father. But when her father is unexpectedly called away for work, Klara sees it as an opportunity to transform Cattle Hill into a Christmas paradise with the aid of a cheeky Christmas elf.

Voice cast 
Henriette Faye-Schjøll as Klara
Sigrid Bonde Tusvik as Kari, Klara's mother
Fridtjov Såheim as Mosk, Klara's father
Marit A. Andreassen as Chickolina
Mats Eldøen as Guttegeiten Gaute
Charlotte Frogner as Pauline

Production 
The soundtrack for the film was composed by Gaute Storaas.

Release 
Christmas at Cattle Hill was released in Norwegian cinemas on 6 November 2020 by SF Studios Norge and Paycom Multimedia. It opened with $159,779, for a total box office gross of $1,088,688. It received over 100,000 admissions during late 2020.

References

External links 

2020 computer-animated films
2020s Norwegian-language films
Norwegian animated films
Norwegian children's films
Norwegian Christmas films
Santa Claus in film